Although Edwin Oswald LeGrand (1801–1861) was born in North Carolina, he was an original Texan.  LeGrand was one of the fifty-seven men who signed the Texas Declaration of Independence.  He was a San Augustine delegate to the Convention of 1836 at Washington-on-the-Brazos and fought in the Battle of San Jacinto.  His sister, Mrs. William Colson Norwood, and her family also settled in San Augustine, Texas.  LeGrand is buried near San Augustine.

References
Handbook of Texas bio

1801 births
1861 deaths
People from North Carolina
People from San Augustine, Texas
People of the Texas Revolution
Signers of the Texas Declaration of Independence